The Susan B. Anthony Childhood House in Battenville, New York was built in 1832.  It was a childhood home of suffragette Susan B. Anthony.  It was listed on the National Register of Historic Places in 2007.

Susan B. Anthony lived there from age 13 to age 19, from 1833 to 1839.  The family moved to there from Adams, Massachusetts, where she was born.  The listing includes the house, a retaining wall, and a carriage barn.  Italianate features were added to the house in 1885.

As of 2006, the property is owned by the state; it is controlled by the OPRHP / Saratoga State Park.

See also
 List of monuments and memorials to women's suffrage

References

Houses on the National Register of Historic Places in New York (state)
Federal architecture in New York (state)
Italianate architecture in New York (state)
Houses completed in 1832
Houses in Washington County, New York
Susan B. Anthony
National Register of Historic Places in Washington County, New York
History of women in New York (state)